This is the list of winners and nominees of the César Award for Best Production Design.

Winners and nominees

1970s

1980s

1990s

2000s

2010s

2020s

See also
Academy Award for Best Production Design
BAFTA Award for Best Production Design
European Film Award for Best Production Designer
Magritte Award for Best Production Design

References

External links 
  
 César Award for Best Production Design at AlloCiné

Production Design